Para toda la vida (English: For all life) is a Mexican telenovela produced for Televisa in 1996.

On Monday, April 15, 1996, Canal de las Estrellas started broadcasting Para toda la vida weekdays at 9:30pm, replacing Acapulco, cuerpo y alma. The last episode was broadcast on Friday, August 2, 1996 with Bendita mentira replacing it.

Ofelia Medina and Exequiel Lavanderos starred as protagonists, while Silvia Pasquel starred as main antagonist.

Cast 
Ofelia Medina as Elena
Exequiel Lavanderos as Fernando Valdemoros Olvido
Silvia Pasquel as Lydia Valdemoros Rivas
Anna Silvetti as Flora Valdemoros Rivas
Margarita Gralia as Adela Montero
Ramón Menéndez as Fortunato
Roberto Blandón as Oscar
Oscar Traven as Lorenzo Montalbán
Olivia Collins as Lucía
Roberto "Flaco" Guzmán as Cipriano
Oscar Morelli as Father Cristóbal
Diana Golden as Silvia
Roberto Palazuelos as Rolando
Héctor Soberón as Alfredo
Isabel Martínez "La Tarabilla" as Eulalia
Beatriz Moreno as Matilde
Roberto "Puck" Miranda as Arquimedes
Pituka de Foronda as Marquise
Fernando Luján as Joan Andreu
Monserrat Gallosa as Violeta
Arath de la Torre as Amadeo
Eduardo Arroyuelo as Enrique Valdemoros
Paola Otero as Estela Valdemoros
Kuno Becker as Eduardo Valdemoros
Araceli Vitta as Marisa
Julio Mannino as Torres
Rodrigo Bastidas as Ignacio

References

External links

1996 telenovelas
Mexican telenovelas
1996 Mexican television series debuts
1996 Mexican television series endings
Television shows set in Mexico
Televisa telenovelas
Mexican television series based on Chilean television series
Spanish-language telenovelas